Thoracochromis brauschi is a species of cichlid endemic to the Fwa River in the Congo Basin, Democratic Republic of the Congo.  This species can reach a length of  TL.

References

Thoracochromis
Fish of Africa
Endemic fauna of the Democratic Republic of the Congo
Taxa named by Max Poll
Fish described in 1965